Graeme Eaglesham (born 30 June 1989) is a Scottish footballer who has played as a forward in the Scottish Football League for Partick Thistle, Albion Rovers and Queen's Park. He now plays for Scottish Junior Football Association, West Region side Glenafton Athletic.

Life and career
Born in Ayr to Gillian and William Eaglesham, he was a pupil at Girvan Academy. He spent time with Ayr United and Hamilton Academical as a youngster, but was released without making an appearance for the first team. He joined Partick Thistle from Maybole Juniors in the summer of 2007 and made his debut in the First Division in April 2008. He spent time on loan at Albion Rovers during the 2008–09 season, making six appearances in the Third Division. Eaglesham made two appearances for Partick.

He was released in the summer of 2009 and moved to Nebraska in the United States to begin a scholarship at Bellevue University. He returned to Scotland in 2010 and joined Queen's Park. Eaglesham made 13 appearances in the Third Division during the 2010–11 campaign and then went back to Bellevue for a further two seasons. Eaglesham signed a two-year contract with Scottish Junior Football West Premier League side Glenafton Athletic in January 2013.

References

External links

1989 births
Living people
Footballers from Ayr
People educated at Girvan Academy
Scottish footballers
Association football forwards
Ayr United F.C. players
Hamilton Academical F.C. players
Partick Thistle F.C. players
Albion Rovers F.C. players
Queen's Park F.C. players
Glenafton Athletic F.C. players
Scottish Football League players
Scottish Junior Football Association players
Bellevue University alumni
Maybole F.C. players